is a South Korean footballer currently playing as a midfielder for Tokushima Vortis.

Career statistics

Club
.

Notes

References

External links

2003 births
Living people
Association football people from Hyōgo Prefecture
Japanese people of South Korean descent
Japanese footballers
South Korean footballers
Association football midfielders
Tokushima Vortis players